Susan Ward (born April 15, 1976) is an American actress and model. She made her film debut in the 1997 sequel, Poison Ivy: The New Seduction, before appearing in films, including, The In Crowd (2000), Going Greek (2001), Shallow Hal (2001) and Wild Things 2 (2004). She is perhaps best known for her roles as Meg Cummings in the entire run of soap opera, Sunset Beach (1997–1999), and as Chloe Kmetko in the series, Make It or Break It (2009–2011).

Early years
Ward was born and raised in Monroe, Louisiana. She is the daughter of detective Eddie Ward and Sue Ward, a nurse and associate professor. Ward began modeling at the age of 13, leaving school and moving to New York City to do so. She attended Northeast Louisiana University for one full year before deciding her acting career.

Career
Ward made her acting debut appearing in the ABC daytime soap opera All My Children in 1995. The following year, she was regular cast member in the short-lived NBC teen drama Malibu Shores, produced by Aaron Spelling. She made guest appearances on Hercules: The Legendary Journeys and Xena: Warrior Princess, and had secondary role in the erotic thriller film Poison Ivy: The New Seduction.

In late 1996, Ward was cast as virginal Meg Cummings on the Aaron Spelling's NBC soap opera Sunset Beach, which aired from 1997 to 1999. In 1999 she turned to films, and starred as the psychotic Brittany Foster in the 2000 teen thriller The In Crowd. The movie was a commercial disappointment in theaters, but found some success on cable and home video. The following year, Ward played a supporting role in the Farrelly Brothers movie Shallow Hal. She has also acted in numerous other direct-to-DVD movies, and has made guest appearances in various TV shows, most notably Friends.  

In 2009, she landed the role Chloe Kmetko, mother of a young gymnast, on the ABC Family drama series Make It or Break It. She was part of the main cast during the show's first two seasons.

Personal life
On June 4, 2005, Ward married David C. Robinson, the vice-president of Morgan Creek Productions, the movie studio that produced The In Crowd. They met when he cast her as the lead of the film  in 1999. Dr. Wayne Keltner, a friend of the bride, performed the ceremony.

Filmography

Film

Television

References

External links
 

American film actresses
American soap opera actresses
Female models from Louisiana
Living people
People from Monroe, Louisiana
20th-century American actresses
21st-century American actresses
American television actresses
Year of birth missing (living people)